Ashihara kaikan (芦原 会館) is a modern full contact street karate developed from Kyokushin karate by Hideyuki Ashihara with influences from various martial arts including Muay Thai, Pankration, and Jujutsu with an emphasis on Sabaki, using footwork and techniques to turn an opponent's power and momentum against them and to reposition oneself to the opponent's "blind" spot. The style is focused on practical application in a real fight including multiple attackers.

History
The first worldwide public display of Sabaki was in the documentary on the first Kyokushin World Open Tournament in 1975. Shihan Hideyuki Ashihara (senior instructor) displayed his Sabaki skills to defeat multiple attackers in a demonstration at the start of documentary. In 1980, Hideyuki Ashihara established his own style of karate forming the New International Karate Organisation (NIKO) - Ashihara Karate Kaikan and became the Kancho (Grandmaster) of NIKO.

The Honbu (headquarters) of Ashihara is located in Matsuyama City. Kancho Ashihara appointed senior student Joko Ninomiya and tournament champion, who was already based in the United States, as Shihan (senior instructor) for the United States.

Technique
The technical aspects of Ashihara are shaped around 6 basic areas:
Basics techniques.
Four movements.
Positioning.
Sabaki
Kata.
Kumite.

The basics are 21 basic techniques which are all practical in a street fight.

The katas are based on Sabaki and are applicable to real fighting situations making them unique in the world of karate. There are six kata types:
Beginners kata (Shoshin no kata).
Basic kata (Kihon no kata).
Throwing kata (Nage no kata).
Sparring kata (Kumite no kata).
Fighting kata (Jissen no kata).
Self-defense kata (Goshin no kata)

In the katas there are three types of pattern: short, middle and long range. Each kata can be used for solo combination practice or with a partner as control technique training. Ashihara Karate is called a modern style, in part, for its revolutionary katas have no historical influence from traditional Samurai era karate katas, every move (strike, footwork, block or sweep) is effective in a street fight with the karateka envisioning an opponent and once the kata is mastered by the karateka it will then be performed with an attacker, with the karateka grading solo and with an attacker.

Full contact fighting (kumite) is practiced in training and in gradings.

Sabaki
'Sabaki is a difficult concept to translate from Japanese. Broadly speaking, 'sabaki refers to movement, often involving a concept of control, sometimes implying preparation for a subsequent movement. For example, Sabaki can be used in reference to training a horse. The rider performs certain movements in an effort to control the animal, in order to make the animal behave as he/she wants it to.

Kancho Hideyuki Ashihara has adopted the word Sabaki to epitomize the essence of this style of Karate. In Ashihara Karate, Sabaki describes the movement made by a defender stepping out of line of an attack, into a position from which he/she can launch a counter-attack. This controlled movement, in preparation for a subsequent advance, is the basis of the strategy of Ashihara Karate: the combination of defence and offense into one ... SABAKI.

The essence of Ashihara Karate is contained within Sabaki, the method of fighting that combines defense and offense into one. In creating Sabaki, Kancho Ashihara considered the various functions of the human body, and how to maximise the body performance in order to control an opponent without being punched or kicked. For example, there are directions of movement that the human body finds easy as well as awkward. If your opponents approach head on, it needs a great deal of power to force them back, especially if they are a lot stronger. If instead, you step to his side and pull him onward, he will carry on under his own steam. At that point, if you apply a little force from the outside, you can change the direction of his momentum and upset his balance. By using your opponents force against them, you can see how someone who is not as strong can fell a much larger opponent. If this principle can be understood and mastered, then karate becomes something which anyone can learn.

Two important concepts of Sabaki are fight control and positioning.

Positioning - refers to the ability to take up a position at the opponents side or back (blindspot) from which you can easily attack without being attacked yourself.

Fight control -  is a term that represent that which Ashihara Karate stands for, it involve a revolutionary, scientific, logical and safe type of self-defense training; specifically, it refers to the ability to take up a safe and strong position from which to contain your opponent and launch a counter-attack.

Instruction guide
Kancho Ashihara published his first book in English in 1985 titled Fighting Karate. An instructional video was released in 1985 in English. A second instructional book titled More Fighting Karate was published in 1989. In Japanese, Kancho Ashihara published his first book in 1983 Jissen Ashihara Karate, his second book in 1984 Jissen Ashihara Karate 2 and his third book in 1987 Jissen Ashihara Karate 3. Kancho Ashihara released his first Japanese instructional video in 1984, his second in 1986  and third also in 1986.

The Ashihara Karate International Organisation led by Kaicho Hoosain Narker has also produced several instructional manuals which includes:
Student Handbook, Kata Guide, Operations Manual, Administration Manual, Teaching Manual, Preparing for Black Belt & Tournament Preparation Manual Kata Guide, Theory Test Handbook

They have also produced several instructional DVD which includes:
Ashihara Karate Sabaki, Ashihara Karate Blue Belt part 1, Ashihara Karate Blue Belt part 2, Ashihara Karate Kata 1

Uniforms and ranking
The karate gi was unique at the time as it featured the name of the style on the back of the jacket in English "Ashihara Karate", in addition to the Ashihara in kanji on the front of the jacket, and also on the left sleeve there was an Ashihara logo in colour and in English. The ranking and belt system is the same as Kyokushin.

The Karate Dogi is the outfit worn for karate training. It consists of a jacket (uwagi) and trousers (zubon) made of white cotton or canvas and a belt (obi), the colour of which indicates the rank of the student.  The Ashihara school allows one to have badges (crests) on the left side of the chest and on the left sleeve. The belt worn indicates the rank of the karate ka according to the standard ranking system adopted in Ashihara Karate. The ten lower ranks (Mudansha) of Kyu or non-black belt holders are divided into the following colours: white, blue, yellow, green and brown. The upper ten ranks (Yudansha) of Dan have the holders wearing the black belt.

Tournament
Kancho Ashihara did not initially create an annual World Tournament for the style. United States Shihan Joko Ninomiya had been holding an annual tournament in Denver since 1978 in Kyokushin rules which continued after NIKO was formed now in Ashihara rules. This tournament named the Sabaki U.S. Open Karate Challenge became the de facto World Tournament open to all styles with Ashihara rules and attracted international entrants including Japanese. The tournament was held until 1988.

The South African NIKO group held their first variant of the Sabaki Challenge Championships in 1987, followed by the second one in 1988. This was after two South Africans, Hoosain Narker & Brian Ebden competed in the last US Sabaki Challenge Championships organised by Joko Ninomiya shihan. Since then they held several others, but in 1990 started an Invitational International Championships supported by Kancho Ashihara with a foreword written by him in the first and second editions of the tournament. In 1996, this tournament merged with the Sabaki Challenge, by then the group had separated from NIKO and formed the AKI. In 2010, the AKI celebrated their dojo's 30th Anniversary by hosting its 30th Anniversary 1st World Championships in Cape Town, South Africa. In October 2018, they will host their 2nd World Championships in Pune, India.

In 1993, Kancho Ashihara gave permission to the Denmark Branch to organize a World Tournament naming it the Sabaki Challenge Spirit. In 1994, the first annual Sabaki Challenge Spirit was held in Denmark. The tournament was only open to NIKO karateka. No Japanese competitors ever entered preferring to compete in Kyokushin tournaments in Japan. In 2011, the tournament affiliation with NIKO ceased and ever since NIKO has organized their own tournament named the Sabaki World Championship.

Ashihara tournaments are similar to Enshin karate tournaments such as rules - weight divisions, winning by knockout or points, scoring, allowed techniques, one handed grabs and throws.

Students
Kancho Ashihara students include former US head instructor Joko Ninomiya (Kyokushin 1978 All Japan Tournament champion and Kyokushin 1975 World Open finalist) founder of Enshin Karate, former Honbu senior instructor Makoto Hirohara (Sabaki US Open Karate Challenge Tournament Champion) founder of Shintaiikudo and former Honbu senior instructor Hiroshi Harada founder of Josui International Karate. Foreign students include David Cook, founder of Tsu Shin Gen & Hoosain Narker, founder of the Ashihara Karate International organisation

Today
Ashihara established branches in Japan and spread throughout the world. Kancho Ashihara died in 1995 at 50 years of age due to illness before his death he named his young son Hidenori to be his successor as Kancho of NIKO.

Karate schools derived from NIKO, include Enshin in the United States, Shintaiikudo in Japan, Josui International Karate Organisation in Japan, Ashihara International Karate Organization (AIKO) in Holland, International Ashihara Karate Association (IAKA) in Russia, Ashihara Karate International (AKI) in South Africa, Ashihara BudoKai in Russia and TSG – Ashihara International Karate in Sweden.

Famous karateka include retired Dutch K-1 World Champion and Glory Champion kickboxer Semmy Schilt, Georgian Glory kickboxer Davit Kiria, Danish UFC fighter Nicolas Dalby, Russian UFC fighter Alexander Volkov and Russian Andrey Levandin five time Sabaki Challenge Spirit champion (2005–2010).

References

Full contact karate
Kyokushin kaikan
Hybrid martial arts
Japanese martial arts